Sultan Rashed (born 5 December 1976) is an Emirati football midfielder who played for United Arab Emirates in the 2004 AFC Asian Cup.

References 

Living people
Emirati footballers
United Arab Emirates international footballers
Association football midfielders
2004 AFC Asian Cup players
Al Ain FC players
UAE Pro League players
1976 births
Footballers at the 1998 Asian Games
Asian Games competitors for the United Arab Emirates